SC Skify Lviv was a Ukrainian football club from Lviv.

Until being promoted to professional level in 1995, it was known as FC LAZ Lviv representing the Lviv Bus Factory (LAZ). After the promotion it changed to Skify-LAZ Lviv for a short period before adopting the name SC Skify Lviv.

League and cup history

{|class="wikitable"
|-bgcolor="#efefef"
! Season
! Div.
! Pos.
! Pl.
! W
! D
! L
! GS
! GA
! P
!Domestic Cup
!colspan=2|Europe
!Notes
|}

References

 
Football clubs in Lviv
Skify Lviv
Association football clubs disestablished in 1996
1996 disestablishments in Ukraine